Irving Leonard (December 28, 1915 – December 13, 1969) was an American financial adviser to Hollywood film stars of the 1950s and 1960s and an associate film producer.

Career
Leonard began as a cost accountant in Washington, D.C. and later moved into the film industry. Amongst his notable clients were James Garner and Clint Eastwood. He was arguably the most responsible for launching Eastwood's career in the late 1950s and 1960s and whom Eastwood described as being "like a second father to me". Leonard, described by Richard Schickel as "a small fastidious man" and a "lightning calculator", closely advised Eastwood on his finances, career moves and even personal purchases such as cars and houses, right from the mid-1950s through to their planning of the film Play Misty for Me in the winter of his death in 1969, Eastwood's directorial debut. It was Leonard who did the groundwork in establishing Eastwood's The Malpaso Company for the film Hang 'Em High in 1967, using the earnings from the Dollars Trilogy. Leonard had served as President of the Malpaso Company and associate producer of Eastwood's films from Hang 'Em High until his death.

Patrick McGilligan, who wrote a 1999 biography of Eastwood, describes Leonard as follows:

Leonard died shortly before Christmas 1969, aged 53. Friends of Eastwood say he was never as devastated in his life as to when he heard the news of Leonard's passing. Leonard had employed two bookkeepers, Roy Kaufman and Howard Berstein, who after his death formed a new entity, Kaufman and Bernstein Inc., and continued to handle Eastwood's portfolio.

References

Bibliography

External links
 

American accountants
American film industry accountants
American film studio executives
American film producers
1915 births
1969 deaths